Marginella lucani is a species of sea snail, a marine gastropod mollusk in the family Marginellidae, the margin snails.

Description
The shell size varies between 11 mm and 15 mm

Distribution
This species occurs in the Atlantic Ocean off Angola.

References

 Gofas, S.; Afonso, J.P.; Brandào, M. (Ed.). (S.a.). Conchas e Moluscos de Angola = Coquillages et Mollusques d'Angola. [Shells and molluscs of Angola]. Universidade Agostinho / Elf Aquitaine Angola: Angola. 140 pp.
 Cossignani T. (2006). Marginellidae & Cystiscidae of the World. L'Informatore Piceno. 408pp.

External links
 
 Jousseaume, F. (1884). Description de mollusques nouveaux. Bulletin de la Société Zoologique de France. 9: 169-192, pl. 4

Endemic fauna of Angola
lucani
Gastropods described in 1884